Eyyvah Eyvah is a 2010 Turkish comedy film, directed by Hakan Algül, which stars Ata Demirer as a young clarinet player who travels to Istanbul in search of his estranged father.

Production
The film was shot on location in Istanbul and Çanakkale, Turkey.

Plot 
Hüseyin (Ata Demirer) is a young man living with his grandparents in a village in Turkey's Thracian region. Two things are of great importance in Hüseyin's life: his clarinet and his fiancée. However, one day Hüseyin is forced to go to İstanbul and leave behind his beloved village. In the big city, Hüseyin will receive the biggest support from his clarinet and later from a bar singer called Firuzan (Demet Akbağ). Firuzan, who storms İstanbul's night clubs with her songs, already leads a very colorful and highly complicated life, which, with Hüseyin's inclusion, gets all the more colorful with comedy and action.

Release
The film opened across Germany on February 25, 2010 and across Turkey and Austria a day later at number one in the Turkish box office chart with an opening weekend gross of $1,597,709.

Reception

Box office
The film was number one at the Turkish box office for four weeks running and has made a total gross of $12,011,619.

References

External links
 
 Ata Demirer: Humor Makes My Life Easier interview with Today's Zaman
 
 

2010 films
2010s Turkish-language films
2010 comedy films
Films set in Turkey
Films set in Istanbul
Turkish comedy films